Karplus is a surname for a family that has been traced back to the Jewish cemetery  in the village of Osoblaha (formerly Hotzenplotz) in the Czech Republic near the border with Poland. All people with the surname "Karplus" appear to be descendants of Alexander Karplus, who died in June 1797 and was the first to carry the family name "Karplus". The name was created in response to the 1787 requirement of the Austrian Empire that all Jewish families have surnames. No one knows what the name means (if anything). Notable people with the surname include:

Arnold Karplus (1877–1968), Czech-Austrian architect
Kevin Karplus (born 1954), American academic
Karplus-Strong string synthesis
Martin Karplus (born 1930), American theoretical chemist and 2013 Nobel Laureate (Chemistry)
Karplus equation
Robert Karplus (1927–1990), American theoretical physicist and educator